Vincent Nguyễn Văn Long O.F.M. Conv. (born 3 December 1961) is a Vietnamese Australian prelate of the Catholic Church. He was appointed the fourth Bishop of Parramatta, Australia, by Pope Francis on 5 May 2016. He has been a bishop since 2011 after serving for several years in the leadership of the Franciscans, first in Australia and later in Rome. He is Australia's first Asian-born bishop and the first Vietnamese-born bishop to head a diocese outside of Vietnam.

Early life and career
Vincent Long Van Nguyen was born on 3 December 1961 in Gia-Kiem, Xuân Lộc, Vietnam. He has four brothers and two sisters. He began studying for the priesthood at the diocesan minor seminary near Saigon in 1972. He fled Vietnam on a refugee boat in 1979, following two of his brothers who had already left, and reached Malaysia, where he spent 16 months in a refugee camp where he learned English. He reached Australia in 1980. In 1983, Long became a Conventual Franciscan friar and studied for the priesthood in Melbourne. He received his priestly ordination on 30 December 1989 from George Pell. He earned a baccalaureate in theology in 1989 from the Melbourne College of Divinity and his licentiate in spirituality and Christology at the Pontifical University of St. Bonaventure (Seraphicum) in Rome in 1994.

His parish assignments included Springvale from 1990 to 1992, Kellyville, New South Wales from 1999 to 2002, and Springvale again from 2002 to 2008. He was also his order's director of postulants for Australia from 1994 to 1998 and Custodial Vicar from 1995 to 2005.

In 2005 he was elected superior of the Order of Friars Minor Conventuals in Australia.

From 2008 to 2011, he served as Assistant General of the Conventual Franciscans at their headquarters in Rome with responsibility for the Asia-Oceania region.

Bishop
Pope Benedict XVI appointed him an auxiliary bishop of the Archdiocese of Melbourne and titular Bishop of Thala on 20 May 2011. He received his episcopal consecration on 23 June 2011 in St Patrick's Cathedral, Melbourne, from Archbishop Denis Hart, Archbishop of Melbourne, with Archbishop Giuseppe Lazzarotto, Apostolic Nuncio, and Cardinal George Pell, Archbishop of Sydney, as co-consecrators. Long addressed the congregation in English and Vietnamese. Speaking to the government representatives in attendance, he said: "In a way, I–a former refugee–stand before you as a testament to the fair go mentality that has shaped this great nation." He is Australia's first Asian-born bishop. He chose as his episcopal motto the Latin phrase  from Luke 5:4, where Jesus tells Simon Peter to "put out into deep water", leading to the catch of fish too large for one boat, a symbol for the Church's work of evangelization. In Melbourne he served the diocese as Episcopal Vicar for Justice and Peace and for Social Services and chaired the Catholic Education Commission. Within the Australian Catholic Bishops Conference, he has been Bishops Delegate for Migrants and Refugees, Chair of Australian Catholic Social Justice Council, and a member of its Permanent Committee.

Pope Francis named him Bishop of Parramatta on 5 May 2016. He is the first Vietnamese-born bishop to head a diocese outside of Vietnam. He was installed on 16 June 2016 at St Patrick's Cathedral. The attendees included Julie Owens the federal Labor Member for Parramatta representing the Federal Opposition Leader and Senator Arthur Sinodinos representing the Prime Minister. Long oversees and guides the local Churches within Parramatta Diocese within his role as Bishop of Parramatta.

Views
In August 2016, Long delivered a lecture on "Pope Francis and the challenges of the Church today". It described the Church in "a watershed moment" and "always in need of reform", "a Church that dares to risk the new frontier rather than a Church that is anchored in a safe harbour". In drew in large part on the language of liberation theology and Pope Francis–"The Church must be the Church of the poor and for the poor"–discussing accompaniment, clericalism, mercy, and openness to the world. Describing the need for "ecclesial inclusiveness", to be "a big tent church", he said:

The Australian reported his remarks under the headline "Catholic bishop calls on Church to accept homosexuality" and some international coverage drew on that. Long said his views had been "completely misrepresented". He wrote in September: "The lecture appealed for respectful language and pastoral engagement with [our gay and lesbian brothers and sisters], based on the fundamental dignity of every person and the teaching and example of Jesus." and "To accept a person's sexual identity does not mean to condone his or her behaviour which are contrary to moral norms and the Church’s teaching."

On 21 February 2017, Long testified before Australia's Royal Commission into Institutional Responses to Child Sexual Abuse. He said: "I was also a victim of sexual abuse by clergy when I first came to Australia, even though I was an adult, so that had a powerful impact on me and how I want to, you know, walk in the shoes of other victims and really endeavour to attain justice and dignity for them." He also told the Commission that a contributing factor to the patterns of sexual abuse was the culture of clericalism that isolates the assignment of clergy from all influence by the laity along with the Church's marginalisation of women. He said titles and forms of address given priests and such popular practices as kissing a bishop's ring needed to change: "I’m not very comfortable with those sorts of practices because they encourage a certain infantilisation of the laity and that creation of the power distance between the ordained and the non-ordained". His testimony was repeatedly applauded by survivors of abuse and their advocates.

Addressing the National Council of priests on 30 August 2017, Long said church culture had contributed to the sex abuse crisis, that the Church needed "a new wine in new wineskins, not a merely cosmetic change or worse, a retreat into restorationism" and explained that "The new wine of God's unconditional love, boundless mercy, radical inclusivity and equality needs to be poured into new wineskins of humility, mutuality, compassion and powerlessness. The old wineskins of triumphalism, authoritarianism and supremacy, abetted by clerical power, superiority, and rigidity, are breaking." He downplayed the significance of the number of vocations, saying: "The strength of our mission does not depend on a cast of thousands. Quality, not quantity, marks our presence. It is substance and not the size of the group that makes the difference. Hence, this time of diminishment can be a blessing in disguise as it makes us reliant less on ourselves but rather on the power of God."

In the weeks preceding the Australian Marriage Law Postal Survey, Long was one of only two Australian bishops who did not advise Catholics to oppose the legalization of same-sex marriage. He wrote in a pastoral letter on 13 September 2017 that each person was free to make an individual decision. He pointed out that the position of the Church that "marriage is a natural institution established by God to be a permanent union between one man and one woman" was unchanged and that the referendum did not address the Church's understanding of the sacramental nature of marriage. He compared it to the way the legalization of divorce left Church law unchanged. He advised that the referendum was a time for "community discernment" as well: "It should be an opportunity for us to witness to our deep commitment to the ideal of Christian marriage. But it should also be an opportunity for us to listen to what the Spirit is saying through the signs of the times." He noted that some Catholics themselves were attracted to members of the same sex or were emotionally attached to those who are: "they are torn between their love for the Church and their love for their same-sex attracted child, grandchild, sibling, cousin, friend or neighbor." He also noted that apart from the survey the Church needed to show more respect than it had for LGBT people, "affirming their dignity and accompanying them on our common journey towards the fullness of life and love in God".

Notes

References

External links
 Installation Mass Homily, 16 June 2016
 Diocese of Parramatta: Our Bishop
 Catholic Hierarchy: Bishop Vincent Long Van Nguyen, O.F.M. Conv.

1961 births
Living people
Bishops appointed by Pope Benedict XVI
Conventual Friars Minor
People from Đồng Nai Province
Roman Catholic Archdiocese of Melbourne
Roman Catholic bishops of Parramatta
21st-century Roman Catholic titular bishops
Vietnamese emigrants to Australia
Vietnamese refugees
21st-century Roman Catholic bishops in Australia
Conventual Franciscan bishops